Looking for Oum Kulthum is a 2017 internationally co-produced drama film about the Egyptian diva Umm Kulthum, directed by Shirin Neshat in collaboration with Shoja Azari. It was screened in the Contemporary World Cinema section at the 2017 Toronto International Film Festival.

Cast
 Neda Rahmanian as Mitra
 Yasmin Raeis as Ghada
 Mehdi Moinzadeh as Amir
 Kais Nashef as Ahmad/Latif

References

External links
 

2017 films
2017 drama films
German drama films
Austrian drama films
Italian drama films
2010s Persian-language films
2010s Arabic-language films
Films directed by Shirin Neshat
2010s English-language films
2017 multilingual films
German multilingual films
Austrian multilingual films
Italian multilingual films
2010s German films